The jhallari, jallary, getchu vadyam or gethuvadyam, is a string percussion instrument from South India. It consists of a large resonator (kudam) carved and hollowed out of a log (usually of jackwood), a tapering neck of 1 to 2 feet long, a string tuning box and four metal strings attached from the kudam to the tuning box.  Jhallari strings are played with two small wooden or bamboo sticks, one on each hand, to create rhythmic patterns or a percussive development.

References

External links
Devotion down the ages | Chennai First

Indian musical instruments
Asian percussion instruments
String instruments